Sir Henri-Thomas Taschereau (October 6, 1841 – October 11, 1909) was a lawyer, politician and judge in Quebec, Canada.

The son of Jean-Thomas Taschereau, Taschereau received his basic education at the Petit Séminaire de Québec from 1851 to 1859. He then entered Université Laval where he received a law degree in 1862 and was called to the bar of Lower Canada in 1863.

After passing the Bar of Quebec, he practised law in Quebec and soon built a large practice. He also pursued an interest in politics and began publishing a short-lived newspaper. Various forays into public life followed and in 1872 was elected to the House of Commons of Canada.

By age 37 his reputation earned him an appointment to the Quebec Superior Court and he served there until 1901 sitting as judge in many important trials. From 1901 to 1907, he headed up two royal commissions for the federal government of Canada.

In 1907, his legal stature was recognized with his appointment as chief justice of Quebec. In 1908, Edward VII knighted him. His death in 1909 left a legacy of writings on the law as part of the records in the courts and commissions where he served.

External links 
 
 
 
 1759: the conquest of Québec

1841 births
1909 deaths
Canadian Knights Bachelor
Judges in Quebec
Lawyers in Quebec
Liberal Party of Canada MPs
Members of the House of Commons of Canada from Quebec
French Quebecers
Henri-Thomas
Université Laval alumni
Burials at Notre Dame des Neiges Cemetery